Magomed Takhirovich Khaskhanov (born 27 June 1975) is a former Russian professional football player.

External links
 
 

1975 births
Living people
Russian footballers
Association football defenders
FC Zhemchuzhina Sochi players
Russian expatriate footballers
Expatriate footballers in Moldova
FC Dacia Chișinău players
FC Angusht Nazran players
Moldovan Super Liga players